Phoebus Levin (fl. mid 1800s.) was a German painter working in London 1855-78 who is known for his 1864 painting of The Dancing Platform at Cremorne Gardens and other depictions of Cremorne Gardens and Covent Garden.

Levin's date of birth and death are uncertain but, according to the Benezit Dictionary of Artists, he was a pupil at the Kunstakademie Berlin from 1836 to 1844, and participated in their exhibitions until 1868.

References

External links 

Greenway National Trust

19th-century German painters
19th-century German male artists
German male painters
1836 births
1908 deaths